Plasmodium achiotense is a parasite of the genus Plasmodium subgenus Carinamoeba. 

Like all Plasmodium species P. cordyli has both vertebrate and insect hosts. The vertebrate hosts for this parasite are reptiles.

Description 

The parasite was first described by Telford in 1987.

Geographical occurrence 

This species is found in Africa.

Clinical features and host pathology 

This species infects cordylid lizards.

References 

cordyli